Brendan Greene (born March 29, 1976), better known as PlayerUnknown, is an Irish video game developer. He is best known for his work on PUBG: Battlegrounds.  He left active development on the game to form PUBG Special Projects and PlayerUnknown Productions in March 2019.

Career 
In 2013, Greene was living in Brazil working as an event photographer and freelance website designer. While trying to save up enough money to buy a plane ticket back to Ireland, he found himself playing video games, particularly the open world survival DayZ Mod for Arma 2. He began to mod the game himself, working under the pseudonym "PlayerUnknown". After experimenting with last-man-standing gameplay, in 2013, he eventually released a mod called "DayZ: Battle Royale", named after the 2000 Japanese sci-fi film "Battle Royale".

PlayerUnknown's Battle Royale (Arma 3 mod) 
After the release of Arma 3, Greene started working on a modification for the game, named PlayerUnknown's Battle Royale. The mod followed the same basic last-man standing principle of the Battle Royale DayZ mod, while also introducing some new features like the airplane that dropped players across a wider spread of terrain and an online leaderboard.

H1Z1: BATTLE ROYALE 
After DayZ: Battle Royale and PlayerUnknown's Battle Royale achieved success within the Arma 2 and Arma 3 Community, Greene was recruited by Sony Online Entertainment as an advisor for the development of a battle royale game mode for H1Z1, recreating the basic elements of DayZ: Battle Royale. H1Z1 released into early access in 2015 with a battle royale mode now known as H1Z1: King of the Kill.

PlayerUnknown's Battlegrounds 

In 2016, H1Z1: King of the Kill caught the attention of South Korean game company Krafton, which reached out to Greene about creating his own game based on his previous work. Greene moved to Korea to join Krafton as a creative director, working on the game that became PlayerUnknown's Battlegrounds, which Greene described as "that sort of final realization of my vision".

PUBG Special Projects / PlayerUnknown Productions 
In March 2019, Greene left development on PUBG and moved to Amsterdam to form PUBG Special Projects. In December 2019, Greene announced a new game called Prologue under a new studio PlayerUnknown Productions, described as "an exploration of new technologies and gameplay."

Greene announced in August 2021 that he was leaving Krafton while maintaining his PlayerUnknown Productions in Amsterdam. He stated that the studio would not be working on the battle royale genre but something more experimental. The new studio continued work on the Prologue game.

References

Video game developers
Living people
1976 births
Irish video game designers
Video game directors